Kalinkovo is a village and municipality in western Slovakia in  Senec District in the Bratislava Region.

History
The village was first mentioned in 1258 as Dénešdi village and later in 1288 as Šemet. In 1948 the name was changed to Kalinkovo that carries today.

Geography
The municipality lies at an altitude of 131 meters and covers an area of 12.912 km². It has a population of 1193 people.

Facilities
The village has a public library, post office, gas distribution network and a football pitch. In the centre of the village is one big church (in comparison with other neighbour villages) called Kostol sv. Františka z Assisi.In this village you can also find a small graveyard with 3 meters tall jesus on the cross statue.

Genealogical resources

The records for genealogical research are available at the state archive "Statny Archiv in Bratislava, Slovakia"

 Roman Catholic church records (births/marriages/deaths): 1672-1896 (parish B)
 Lutheran church records (births/marriages/deaths): 1706-1895 (parish B)

See also
 List of municipalities and towns in Slovakia

External links/Sources
 
  Official page
https://web.archive.org/web/20070513023228/http://www.statistics.sk/mosmis/eng/run.html 

Surnames of living people in Kalinkovo

Villages and municipalities in Senec District